Ralph Stanley is an album by American country singer Ralph Stanley, released in 2002. It was produced by Bob Neuwirth, Larry Ehrlich and T Bone Burnett.

Track listing
"Lift Him Up, That's All" – 4:41
"False Hearted Lover's Blues" – 4:52
"Henry Lee" – 4:43
"Girl from the Greenbriar Shore" – 3:59
"Twelve Gates to the City" – 1:57
"Little Mathie Grove" – 4:30
"Look on and Cry" – 3:38
"I'll Remember You Love in My Prayers" – 1:31
"Calling You" – 3:25
"The Death of John Henry" – 3:59
"Great High Mountain" – 3:42

Personnel
Ralph Stanley – vocals
Stuart Duncan – banjo, violin
Dennis Crouch – bass
Norman Blake – guitar, lap steel guitar, mandocello
Mike Compton – mandolin
Evelyn Cox – harmony vocals
Suzanne Cox – harmony vocals

Chart performance

References

Ralph Stanley albums
2002 albums
Albums produced by T Bone Burnett
Albums produced by Bob Neuwirth
Columbia Records albums